Don Bell is a Canadian wheelchair curler.

Teams

References

External links 

Living people
1966 births
Canadian male curlers
Canadian wheelchair curlers